Hugo Gottschlich (1905–1984) was an Austrian stage and film actor, who specialised in Viennese character parts. Later in his career he appeared frequently on television.

Selected filmography
 Arlberg Express (1948)
 Fregola (1948)
 On Resonant Shores (1948)
 Kissing Is No Sin (1950)
 Cordula (1950)
 City Park (1951)
 Miracles Still Happen (1951)
 White Shadows (1951)
 Vienna Waltzes (1951)
 1. April 2000 (1952)
 A Night in Venice (1953)
 To Be Without Worries (1953)
 Anna Louise and Anton (1953)
 The Spendthrift (1953)
 The Red Prince (1954)
 Mozart (1955)
 Sarajevo (1955)
 Imperial and Royal Field Marshal (1956)
 The Saint and Her Fool (1957)
 Vienna, City of My Dreams (1957)
 And Lead Us Not Into Temptation (1957)
 Candidates for Marriage (1958)
 The Priest and the Girl (1958)
 The Good Soldier Schweik (1960)
 Mariandl (1961)
 Mariandl's Homecoming (1962)
 Marry Me, Cherie (1964)
 Schweik's Awkward Years (1964)
 Der Weibsteufel (1966)

References

Bibliography
 Fritsche, Maria. Homemade Men In Postwar Austrian Cinema: Nationhood, Genre and Masculinity . Berghahn Books, 2013.

External links

1905 births
1984 deaths
Austrian male film actors
Austrian male stage actors
Male actors from Vienna